Staro Selo is a village near Otočac, Croatia.

Demographics
According to the census in 2001, the village had a population of 17 and 6 family households.

History
Staro Selo was founded around 1658 by Uzelac and 12 other families.

People
Arsen Diklić - Writer.

References 
 Plemenski rječnik ličko-krbavske županije. - In Croatian
 Karl Kaser - Popis Like i Krbave 1712 - In Croatian and German

Populated places in Lika-Senj County